Paap Aur Punya  is a Bollywood drama film directed by Prayag Raj. The film stars Shashi Kapoor, Sharmila Tagore and Ajit. Shashi Kapoor also appears in dual role.

Plot
Fair-minded Raja Gajraj Singh is overthrown in a coup by his brother, Balbir Singh. Both Gajraj's and Balbir's wives are pregnant, and give birth to twin sons, and a son respectively. Balbir orders that Gajraj's son be killed. Then he arranges for Gajraj and his wife's accidental death by a motor vehicle. Years go by, most people have forgotten Raja Gajraj, and Balbir is the sole acclaimed ruler with his fair-minded and soft-spoken son, Ganga Singh, who is all set to succeed the throne from his dad. Then Ganga meets a young woman named Jugni from a poor family and falls in love with her, she too falls in love with him, and both want to get married. But Balbir will not have anything to do with her, as he would like Ganga to marry rich and wealthy Mala. Chaos and anarchy suddenly descent upon the palace, when Ganga undergoes a character change and becomes womanizing, alcoholic, and foul-mouthed, much to the chagrin of his dad. But the clouds do have a silver lining for Ganga is now willing to wed Mala. What was the reason behind the sudden change in Ganga? What will the poor heart-broken Jugni do now?

Cast
Shashi Kapoor as Ganga Singh / Jwala Singh
Sharmila Tagore as Jugni
Ajit as Balbir Singh
Asrani as Palace Official
Aruna Irani as Mala
Achala Sachdev as Ganga's mom
Murad as Raja Gajraj Singh 
Manik Irani  
Moolchand as Salim 
Jagdish Raj as Police Inspector
Pinchoo Kapoor as Tiger
Roopesh Kumar as Marqas- Tiger's associate
Gurcharan Pohli as Shera- Tiger's associate
Indrani Mukherjee 
Kunal Kapoor as Young Ganga / Jwala Singh
Ramesh Goyal as Inspector Rana
Baby Guddu as Pinky
Margaret Bhatty as Indian Airlines Cabin Crew

Songs
 Bolo Baadal Ki Mehbooba Kaun Hain - Kishore Kumar, Lata Mangeshkar 
 O Rang Rasiya Re Main Toh Shaam Se Baithi Thi - Kanchan
 Main Hoon Jodhpur Ki Jugni - Lata Mangeshkar 
 Tere Mere Pyaar Ki Bandh Gayi Jab Yeh Dor -Mukesh, Kanchan

References

External links

1974 films
1970s Hindi-language films
Indian drama films